During the 2017–18 season, Granada CF participated in the Spanish Segunda División, and the Copa del Rey.

Squad

Transfers
List of Spanish football transfers summer 2017#Granada

In

Out

Competitions

Overall

Segunda Division

League table

Matches

Kickoff times are in CET.

Copa del Rey

Statistics

Appearances and goals
Last updated on 3 June 2018

|-
! colspan=14 style=background:#dcdcdc; text-align:center|Goalkeepers

|-
! colspan=14 style=background:#dcdcdc; text-align:center|Defenders

|-
! colspan=14 style=background:#dcdcdc; text-align:center|Midfielders

|-
! colspan=14 style=background:#dcdcdc; text-align:center|Forwards

|-
! colspan=14 style=background:#dcdcdc; text-align:center| Players who have made an appearance or had a squad number this season but have been loaned out or transferred
|-

|-
|}

References

Granada CF seasons
Granada CF